Tarcoola Airport  is a small airport located around 125 km south of Coober Pedy.

Facilities 
The airport has 2 runways.

 Runway 1: has a length of 1270 m (4166 ft), is made of asphalt, and has an approximate heading of 09/27.
 Runway 2: is the main runway that has a length of 1300 m (4265 ft), also made of asphalt, and has an approximate heading of 03/21.

See also
List of airports in South Australia

References 

Airports in South Australia